The following is a list of European mystery writers whose works have been translated in various European languages.

List

References

See also
List of mystery writers
List of Asian crime fiction writers

European mystery writers
European mystery writers
Mystery writers
European mystery writers
Writ